Bouchier may refer to:

Antoine Bouchier (1460–1519), French Roman Catholic bishop and cardinal
Barton Bouchier (1794–1864), English religious writer
Cecil Bouchier KBE, DFC (1895–1979), served with the British Army, Royal Flying Corps, Indian Air Force and Royal Air Force from 1915 to 1953
Chili Bouchier (1909–1999), English film and theatre actress
George Bouchier or Bourchier (died 1643), wealthy merchant of Bristol who supported the royalist cause during the English Civil War
Gilles Bouchier or Bucherius (or Bucherus) (1576–1665), French Jesuit and chronological scholar
John Bouchier, 2nd Baron Berners (1467–1533), English soldier, statesman and translator
John Bouchier-Hayes (born 1944), Irish fencer
George Bouchier Worgan (1757–1838), English naval surgeon who accompanied the First Fleet to Australia

See also
Dorothy Britton, Lady Bouchier MBE (1922–2015), translator from Japanese, composer, poet
Boshier
Boucher (disambiguation)
Bourchier